"The Way You Make Me Feel" is a 1987 single by American singer Michael Jackson.

The Way You Make Me Feel or similar may also refer to:
 "The Way You Make Me Feel" (Ronan Keating song), a 2000 single by Irish singer-songwriter Ronan Keating
 "It's the Way You Make Me Feel", a 2001 song by the British band Steps

See also

 "I Close My Eyes and Count to Ten", a 1968 single by British singer Dusty Springfield (prominently featuring the line "It's the way you make me feel")